"She Don't Love You" is a song co-written and recorded by American country music artist Eric Paslay. It was released on October 13, 2014 as the fourth and final single from Paslay's self-titled debut album. Paslay wrote the song with Runaway June's Jennifer Wayne. It was originally written for George Strait.

Critical reception
Billy Dukes of Taste of Country gave the song a favorable review, calling it "a well-told story about a woman whose heart has been shattered one time too many" and writing that "Paslay exposes one’s most buried vulnerabilities." Markos Papadatos of Digital Journal wrote that "one can feel the raw emotions that Paslay sings about."

Music video
The music video was directed by Wes Edwards and premiered in March 2015.

Chart performance
"She Don't Love You" debuted at number 52 on the U.S. Billboard Country Airplay chart for the week of November 1, 2014. It also debuted at number 50 on the U.S. Billboard Hot Country Songs chart for the week of November 22, 2014.  The song has sold 389,000 copies in the US as of June 2015.

Year-end charts

References 

2014 songs
2014 singles
Eric Paslay songs
EMI Records singles
Songs written by Eric Paslay
Song recordings produced by Marshall Altman
Music videos directed by Wes Edwards